Kinnakorai is a village in Kundha Taluk, Nilgiris District, Tamil Nadu. 

Previously, coffee was grown, but now the main income source is tea cultivation.

References

Villages in Nilgiris district